Richard Henry Hill (26 November 1893 – 1971) was an English international footballer who played as a left back.

Career
Born in Mapperley, former Grenadier Guard Hill played professionally for Millwall and Torquay United, and earned one cap for England on 24 May 1926 against Belgium in Antwerp.

Dick played mainly as a left back, but also played at centre half and right back. He played 314 Football League games, 24 Southern League games and 28 FA Cup games for Millwall. His total of 366 games leaves him sixth in the list of most appearances for Millwall.

He joined Torquay United in July 1930 and made 28 appearances scoring his only senior goal.

References
Bibliography

Citations

1893 births
1971 deaths
Footballers from Nottingham
English footballers
England international footballers
Association football fullbacks
Millwall F.C. players
Torquay United F.C. players
English Football League players
People from Mapperley
Footballers from Nottinghamshire